Comic Con Ukraine (abbreviated CCU) is a speculative fiction entertainment annual exhibition and fan convention of computer and video games, TV series and comic movies in Ukraine. First convention was held alongside the Art Factory «Platform» in 2018.

From the beginning the showcasing primarily comic books and science fiction/fantasy related film, television, and similar popular arts, the convention includes a larger range of pop culture and entertainment elements across virtually all genres, including horror, animation, anime, manga, toys, collectible card games, video games, webcomics, and fantasy novels in the country.

History

2018 
The convention was held on September 22–23, with more than 20,000 visitors, which made the festival the largest in Ukraine. Star guests was John Rhys-Davies, Bryan Dechart and Amelia Rose Blaire.

2019 
The convention was held on September 21–22, with more than 30,000 visitors, which made him the most visited Comic Con in Eastern Europe. Foreign guests of the festival was John Romero, Danny Trejo and Christopher Lloyd. A separate model museum of the Star Wars franchise from the "Yavin" (Poland) design team was reopened at the festival. Germany's "Project X1" team has brought a realistic model of the T-65 X-Wing star fighter from the Star Wars franchise. The length of the model is 34 feet, weight - 2.3 tons, it has the autographs of many artists. There were 14 bands performing on the main stage, including the American Magic Sword.
A lot of Ukrainian comic book publishers participated in the festival. 44 future Ukrainian editions of localized and copyrighted comics have been announced, as well as the first artbooks for video games in Ukrainian; Sales for more than 30 new comics have been launched.

Locations and dates

See also 
 East European Comic Con
 Comic Con

References

External links 

 
 
 
 
 

Annual events in Ukraine
Video game trade shows
Video gaming in Ukraine
Multigenre conventions
Comics conventions
Recurring events established in 2018
2018 establishments in Ukraine